Sian Harries is a Welsh writer and actor. She is known for her work on Man Down and Tourist Trap. Harries is married to comedian Rhod Gilbert.

Career 
Harries worked on season one of Man Down and was promoted to co-writer during the show's second season. She wrote and starred in Tourist Trap on BBC Wales. She wrote and appeared in the radio sketch comedy, Here Be Dragons.

In 2018, Harries co-produced, wrote, and starred in the film, NeckFace. She was nominated for Best Short Film (with Barry Castagnola and Jacqueline Wright) for NeckFace at the BAFTA Cymru Awards that year.

In June 2020, Harries and her partner Rhod Gilbert launched a podcast titled, The Froth. She was named "one to watch" by the Edinburgh TV festival in 2021. Harries and Gilbert co-own the production company, Llanbobl Vision.

Personal life 
Harries was born in Carmarthen, Wales. She married her long-time partner, comic Rhod Gilbert, in 2013. In 2022, following Gilbert's diagnosis with cancer, the couple moved three times to live closer to the hospital where he was undergoing treatment.

References

External links 

Living people
21st-century Welsh women writers
Welsh television writers
Welsh comedy writers
21st-century Welsh actresses
People from Carmarthen
Date of birth missing (living people)
Year of birth missing (living people)
British women television writers